BRAF-activated non-protein coding RNA is a noncoding RNA that in humans is encoded by the BANCR gene.
 Long non-coding RNAs (lncRNAs) are involved in the intricate network of cancer and contribute significantly to tumorigenesis and progression. BRAF activated non-coding RNA (BANCR), a 693-bp four-exon transcript, was first identified in 2012 as an oncogenic long non-coding RNA in BRAFV600E melanomas cells and was found to be associated with melanoma cell migration. Apart from melanoma, growing evidence has implicated BANCR in the development and progression of a variety of other human malignancies, including retinoblastoma, lung cancer, and gastric cancer, since its discovery. The pattern of expression of BANCR varies according to the kind of cancer, acting as either a tumour suppressor or an accelerator. Functional BANCR may be a useful biomarker for cancer diagnosis and prognosis assessment. BANCR-targeted therapy may also prove to be a promising new treatment option for human cancers.

References

Further reading